Lost Valley is a ski area in the northeastern United States, in Auburn, Maine. Its east-facing slopes feature 21 trails & 9 gladed trails across the hill, and is served by four lifts two chairlifts, one ground lift carpet & one tow lift in their snowtubing park. Lost Valley is home to the Maine Family Snow Tube Park.

Statistics
Facts
Year opened:  1961
Number of lifts:  4
Double chairs:  2
Elevation 
Vertical drop:  
Longest run:  
Skiable area:  
Snowmaking:  
Types of runs
 Beginner:  40%
 Intermediate:  27%
 Advanced:  33%
 Expert:  0%
Terrain Parks: 2

Terrain 

Most of Lost Valley's trails are rated easiest and intermediate, with a limited amount of expert terrain. 

Family regrouping is simple as all trails come together a short distance from each other.

Lost Valley also offers  of Nordic skiing trails, and a ski lodge offering a ski school and rentals.

Summer use 
In the summer months, Lost Valley changes from a ski resort into an outdoor recreational facility featuring brewpub, nanobrewery, mountain biking, horseshoes and corn hole for indoor and outdoor fun.

U.S. Ski Team
 Julie Parisien, silver medalist in slalom at 1993 World Championships, three-time Olympian (1992, 1994, 1998)
 Rob Parisien, 1992 Olympian, slalom (20th)
 Anne-Lise Parisien, 1994 Olympian, giant slalom (13th)
 John Bower, 1964 and 1968 Olympian, Nordic skiing

References

External links 
 

Ski areas and resorts in Maine
Buildings and structures in Androscoggin County, Maine
Tourist attractions in Androscoggin County, Maine